Iulian Erhan (born 1 July 1986) is a Moldovan professional footballer. As of 2020, he plays for Spartanii Selemet.

He has several caps for his national football team.

Honours
Zimbru Chișinău
Moldovan Cup: 2006–07, 2013–14
Moldovan Super Cup: 2014

Zimbru-2 Chișinău
Moldovan "A" Division: 2005–06, 2006–07

Milsami Orhei
Moldovan National Division: 2014–15

References

External links
 
 
 
 
 

1986 births
Living people
Moldovan footballers
Association football defenders
Moldova youth international footballers
Moldova international footballers
Moldovan expatriate footballers
Expatriate footballers in Russia
Expatriate footballers in Belarus
Moldovan Super Liga players
FC Zimbru Chișinău players
FC Rapid Ghidighici players
FC Mordovia Saransk players
FC Academia Chișinău players
FC Torpedo-BelAZ Zhodino players
FC Milsami Orhei players
CSF Bălți players
FC Sfîntul Gheorghe players